Associazione Sportiva Dilettantistica Sarzanese Calcio 1906 is an Italian association football club located in Sarzana, Liguria. It currently plays in Seconda Categoria Liguria/F.

History
Sarzanese was founded in 1906 and refounded in 1919.

In the summer 2011 it renounce expressly to Serie D 2011-12 and in the season 2011–12 it restarts from Seconda Categoria.

Colors and badge
Its colors are red and black.

References

External links
Official Website
LND site

Football clubs in Liguria
Association football clubs established in 1906
Serie C clubs
1906 establishments in Italy